Vaughan Richard Sharp (born June 1, 1948) is a former American football tackle who played three seasons with two different teams, the  Pittsburgh Steelers and the Denver Broncos of the National Football League. He was drafted by the Pittsburgh Steelers of the 12th round of the 288th pick in the 1970 NFL draft. He played college football at the University of Washington for the Washington Huskies football team.

References

1948 births
Living people
Sportspeople from London
American football tackles
Pittsburgh Steelers players
Denver Broncos players
Washington Huskies football players